North Judson-San Pierre High School is a public high school located in North Judson, Indiana.

Athletics
North Judson-San Pierre High School's athletic teams are the Blue Jays and they compete in the Hoosier North Athletic Conference. The school offers a wide range of athletics including:

Baseball
Basketball (Men's and Women's)
Cheerleading
Cross Country (Co-Ed)
Football
Golf (Men's and Women's)
Softball
Swimming (Co-Ed)
Tennis
Track and field (Co-Ed)
Wrestling

Music Department
North Judson-San Pierre Jr/Sr High School offers both band and choir for students 7–12. Although the sixth grade is in a different building, they are provided a ride to the Jr/Sr building for band for one class period. The band consists of beginning band, intermediate band, and advanced band. The high school also has treble choir, beginning choir, and concert choir. 
There is also a theatrical performance during second semester.

See also
 List of high schools in Indiana

References

External links
 Official website

Buildings and structures in Starke County, Indiana
Schools in Starke County, Indiana